Korneliya Nikolaeva Naydenova (born 1 February 1982) is a Bulgarian footballer who plays as a goalkeeper. She has been a member of the Bulgaria women's national team.

References

1982 births
Living people
Women's association football goalkeepers
Bulgarian women's footballers
Bulgaria women's international footballers
FC NSA Sofia players